John Lincoln may refer to:
John Lincoln (judge) (1916–2011), Australian judge
John C. Lincoln (1866–1959), American inventor, entrepreneur, and philanthropist
John Lincoln (politician) (born 1981), member of the Alaska House of Representatives
John Lincoln Williams (born 1961), Welsh author, who also used John Lincoln as a pen name

See also
John J. Lincoln House, historic building in Elkhorn, West Virginia.